Marcel Schein (June 9, 1902 – February 20, 1960) was a Slovak-born American physicist, best known for his work on cosmic rays. He is the father of former MIT professor Edgar Schein.

Biography 

Marcel Schein was born in Trstená, Kingdom of Hungary on June 9, 1902.

He died in Chicago on February 20, 1960, and was buried at Oak Woods Cemetery.

Education and career 
Schein studied at the universities of Vienna, Würzburg and Zurich, where he got his PhD with the best mark, magna cum laude. In the following years he taught at several European universities. In 1938, he emigrated to the United States where he joined the University of Chicago's Institute of Physics as staff researcher. In 1943, he joined the university's faculty. He was promoted to a full professor three years later in 1946.

Bibliography 
 Problems in cosmic ray physics, 1946

See also 
 Schein

References

External links 
 
 
 Collected Papers at the University of Chicago
 http://libserv.aip.org:81/ipac20/ipac.jsp?uri=full=3100001~!6587~!0&profile=newcustom-icos
 https://web.archive.org/web/20070208073557/http://physics.syr.edu/~rsholmes/genealogy.html (biography)
 https://archive.today/20040818091217/http://www.astrocosmo.cl/astrofis/astrofis-03_06.htm (Italian)
Guide to the Marcel Schein Papers 1929-1960 at the University of Chicago Special Collections Research Center

1902 births
1960 deaths
20th-century Slovak people
20th-century Hungarian physicists
Slovak physicists
American nuclear physicists
Czech nuclear physicists
American people of Slovak descent
Jewish American scientists
Jewish physicists
20th-century American physicists
Academic staff of ETH Zurich
20th-century American Jews